Rear-Admiral Sir Patrick Barton Rowe  (born 1939) is a retired Royal Navy officer.

The son of a Royal Navy captain, Barton entered the Navy himself in 1960; after serving in the Far East Fleet and then in various command and staff roles, he was appointed Military Deputy to the head of the government's Defence Export Services Organisation in 1990, serving until 1992. The following year, he became clerk to the Worshipful Company of Leathersellers, and then in 1996 he was appointed Deputy Master of Trinity House and Chairman of the General Lighthouse Authority. He retired in 2002 and was appointed a Knight Commander of the Royal Victorian Order in that year's New Year Honours. He had been appointed a Commander of the Order of the British Empire in the 1990 New Year Honours.

References 

Living people
1939 births
Royal Navy officers
Knights Commander of the Royal Victorian Order
Commanders of the Order of the British Empire